Isis Nable Valverde (born 17 February 1987) is a Brazilian actress who played a lead role in the 2010 telenovela Ti Ti Ti and has participated in several other telenovelas.

Biography 
Valverde was born in Aiuruoca, Minas Gerais. She moved to Belo Horizonte to study when she was 15 years old. She starred in several advertisements when she was 16 years old, and moved to Rio de Janeiro at the age of 18 to study theater. She has Italian grandparents.

Career 
She played a mysterious character named Ana do Véu (Ana of the Veil) in the 2006 Rede Globo telenovela Sinhá Moça. Valverde played her first villain in the 2007 telenovela Paraíso Tropical, a prostitute named Telma. The actress played a sexy manicurist named Rakelli in the 2008 telenovela Beleza Pura.

Valverde played Camila in the 2009 telenovela Caminho das Índias, her character falls in love to Ravi, an Indian character played by Caio Blat. She played a lead role for the first time in the 2010 telenovela Ti Ti Ti, as Marcela, a character who gets involved in a romantic triangle with Edgar (played by Caio Castro) and Renato (played by Guilherme Winter). The actress played the lead female role Maria Lúcia in the 2011 film Faroeste Caboclo, released on May 30, 2013. She played an unlucky character named Catarina in the A Culpada de BH episode of the 2012 television series As Brasileiras. She played Suellen in the 2012 Rede Globo telenovela Avenida Brasil.  Valverde played the lead character, Sereia, in the 2013 Rede Globo miniseries O Canto da Sereia. She plays Antônia in the 2014 miniseries Amores Roubados, a young woman who starts a relationship with a thief.

Filmography

Television

Cinema

Awards and nominations

References

External links 

1987 births
Living people
People from Minas Gerais
Brazilian people of Italian descent
Brazilian television actresses